Ajay or Ajai may refer to:

People
 Ajay (given name)
 Abe Ajay (1919–1998), American artist
 Ajay (actor), Indian actor prominent in Telugu cinema

Places
 Ajai Wildlife Reserve, northeastern Uganda
 Ajay River, a major river in Jharkhand and West Bengal
 Ajay, Iran, a village in East Azerbaijan Province, Iran

Films
 Ajay (1996 film), a 1996 Hindi language film directed by Suneel Darshan
 Ajay (2006 film), a 2007 Kannada language film

Other uses
 INS Ajay (P34), an Abhay-class corvette

See also
 AJ (disambiguation)